Epidemas obscurus is a species of cutworm or dart moth in the family Noctuidae.

The MONA or Hodges number for Epidemas obscurus is 10003.

References

Further reading

 
 
 

Xylenini
Articles created by Qbugbot
Moths described in 1903